The 1989 Nordic Figure Skating Championships were held from February 24th through 26th, 1989 in Copenhagen, Denmark. The competition was open to elite figure skaters from Nordic countries. Skaters competed in two disciplines, men's singles and ladies' singles, across two levels: senior (Olympic-level) and junior.

Senior results

Men

Ladies

Junior results

Men

Ladies

References

Nordic Figure Skating Championships, 1989
Nordic Figure Skating Championships, 1989
Nordic Figure Skating Championships
International figure skating competitions hosted by Denmark
International sports competitions in Copenhagen